Daniel F. Farrell (c. 1869 – June 18, 1939) was an American politician from New York.

Life
He attended St. Patrick's Academy in Brooklyn; and then became a hatter.

Farrell was a member of the New York State Assembly (Kings Co., 7th D.) in 1910, 1911, 1912, 1913, 1914, 1915, 1916, 1917 and 1918; and was Chairman of the Committee on Commerce and Navigation in 1913.

He was a member of the New York State Senate (5th D.) from 1919 to 1930, sitting in the 142nd, 143rd, 144th, 145th, 146th, 147th, 148th, 149th, 150th, 151st, 152nd and 153rd New York State Legislatures. He resigned his seat in August 1930, and was appointed as Deputy Register of Kings County.

He died on June 18, 1939, at his home at 1472 East 9th Street in Brooklyn.

Sources

Year of birth uncertain
1869 births
1939 deaths
Politicians from Brooklyn
Democratic Party members of the New York State Assembly
Democratic Party New York (state) state senators